The Snowball: Warren Buffett and the Business of Life is a biography of Warren Buffett by Alice Schroeder.

History
Before this book was written, Warren Buffett rejected numerous approaches by biographers, journalists, and publishers to cooperate on an account of his life. After spending six years as the only Wall Street analyst Buffett would speak to, Alice Schroeder was approached by Buffett to write his biography. In 2003, she left her job at Morgan Stanley and traveled to Omaha to work on the book full-time. Schroeder spent over 2,000 hours reading Buffett's personal files while interviewing Buffett, his wife, children, sisters, friends, and business associates. Before Schroeder began writing, Buffett told her he would not ask for any revisions once the book was finished and, where accounts of his life differed, to always use the "less flattering version."

Reception
The Snowball was Amazon.com's best business and investing book of the year 2008. Time Magazine, People Magazine, and critic Janet Maslin of The New York Times named it one of ten best books of the year. The Washington Post, the Financial Times, BusinessWeek, and Publishers Weekly also each named The Snowball the best book of 2008. The book was shortlisted for the 2008 Financial Times and Goldman Sachs Business Book of the Year Award, as well as the 2009 Gerald Loeb Award for distinguished business journalism. A reviewer in The Economist noted that for those "hoping for detailed analyses of his investment record" the place to start is "Mr. Buffett’s collected essays and annual reports." As a look at Buffett, the Washington Post stated The Snowball was "the most detailed glimpse inside Warren Buffett and his world that we likely will ever get...a bible for capitalists” and the Los Angeles Times wrote it was "the most authoritative portrait of one of the most important American investors of our time."

Editions 
1st Edition, 2008, Bantam Books,  
Unabridged Audio Edition, 2008, Random Audio, 
Abridged Audio Edition, 2008, Random Audio, 
Paperback, 2009, Bantam Books,

References

External links

2008 non-fiction books
Biographies about businesspeople
Buffett family